Football Kingz Football Club was a New Zealand professional association football club based in Auckland. The club was formed and admitted into the National Soccer League in 1995. The club had never qualified for the Finals series in the National Soccer League in all five seasons of existence until they became defunct in 2004.

The list encompasses the records set by the club, their managers and their players. The player records section itemises the club's leading goalscorers and those who have made most appearances in first-team competitions. It also records notable achievements by Football Kingz players on the international stage. Attendance records in Newcastle are also included.

The club's record appearance maker was Harry Ngata, who made 128 appearances between 1999 and 2004. Harry Ngata was also Football Kingz's record goalscorer, scoring 29 goals in total.

Player records

Appearances

Most appearances
Competitive matches only, includes appearances as substitute. Numbers in brackets indicate goals scored.

Goalscorers
 Most goals in a season: Dennis Ibrahim, 12 goals (in the 2000–01 season)

Top goalscorers
Peter Buljan was the all-time top goalscorer for Football Kingz.

Competitive matches only. Numbers in brackets indicate appearances made.

Club records

Matches
 First National Soccer League match: Football Kingz 0–3 Carlton, National Soccer League, 1 October 1999
 Record win:
 4–0 against Parramatta Power, National Soccer League, 19 April 2000
 5–1 against Newcastle United, National Soccer League, 27 October 2000
 Record defeat: 0–7 against Parramatta Power, National Soccer League, 5 December 1997
 Record consecutive wins:
 3, from 15 November 2002 to 6 December 2002
 Record consecutive defeats: 7, from 15 February 2002 to 7 April 2002
 Record consecutive draws: 2, from 11 October 2002 to 20 October 2002
 Record consecutive NSL matches without a defeat: 6, from 23 February 2001 to 6 April 2001
 Record consecutive matches without a win: 10, from 2 February 2002 to 22 September 2002

Goals
 Most NSL goals scored in a season: 57 in 34 matches, National Soccer League, 1999–2000
 Fewest NSL goals scored in a season: 25 in 24 matches, National Soccer League, 2003–04
 Most NSL goals conceded in a season: 59 in 34 matches, National Soccer League, 1999–2000
 Fewest NSL goals conceded in a season: 45 in 24 matches, National Soccer League, 2002–03

Points
 Most points in a season: 50 in 34 matches, National Soccer League, 1999–2000
 Fewest points in a season: 14 in 24 matches, National Soccer League, 2001–02

Attendances
 Highest attendance: 13,111, against Marconi Fairfield, National Soccer League, 1 November 1996
 Lowest attendance: 892, against South Melbourne, National Soccer League, 14 February 2004

References

Football Kingz